Peace is the tenth studio album from American heavy metal band Demon Hunter.  The work, together with War, was published by Solid State Records on 1 March 2019.  The band released multiple singles before the album was released. Loudwire named both albums together as one of the 50 best metal albums of 2019.

Musical style 
Lead singer Ryan Clark indicating that each of the two albums (War and Peace) "could be devoted to their contrasting musical styles - heavy and melodic."

Both albums were professionally reviewed in the Jesus Freak Hideout website. In the Peace review, reviewer Wayne Myatt said that even though the album is not of the band's best, "it is a good album that should please most Demon Hunter and hard rock fans," with some songs being "more of medium level hard rock tune than can sometimes lean more towards metal."

Track listing

Personnel 
Demon Hunter
 Ryan Clark – vocals
 Patrick Judge – lead guitar
 Jeremiah Scott – rhythm guitar
 Jon Dunn – bass
 Timothy "Yogi" Watts – drums

Additional personnel
 Zeuss - mixing and mastering
 Joanna Ott - piano on "Fear Is Not My Guide"

Charts

References 

Demon Hunter albums
2019 albums
Solid State Records albums